The Cock is a Grade II listed public house at 360 North End Road, Fulham, London.

It was built in the mid-late 19th century, but the architect is not known.

Since 2012, it is called the "Cock Tavern", and is part of the Young's pub chain.

From February 2007 to 2012, it was a brewpub, the "Cock & Hen", owned by The Capital Pub Company. Before 2007, it was "The Cock".

References

Grade II listed buildings in the London Borough of Hammersmith and Fulham
Grade II listed pubs in London
Pubs in the London Borough of Hammersmith and Fulham
Fulham